His Majesty's Government Communications Centre (HMGCC) is an organisation which provides electronics and software to support the communication needs of the British Government. Based at Hanslope Park, near Milton Keynes in Buckinghamshire, it is closely linked with the Foreign, Commonwealth and Development Office and the British intelligence community.

History
HMGCC used to have a communications centre at Signal Hill near Gawcott, in Buckinghamshire. Stephen Ball was Chief Executive until 2000, when Dr John Widdowson took over; Widdowson moved to GCHQ in 2005.

Structure
The organisation employs more than 380 personnel and the solutions it provides are bespoke to fit the needs of the government, its organisations, and specifically its intelligence assets. HMGCC is responsible for research and design in the following disciplines:
 RF engineering
 Signal processing
 Software engineering
 Acoustics
 Audio engineering
 Operating systems
 GUI design
 Embedded systems
 System engineering
 Manufacture and application of microcircuits
 Study of power sources
 Operational research
 Mechanical engineering

See also
 GCHQ
 MI5
 MI6
 Bletchley Park
Hanslope Park

References

External links
 Official HMGCC Website
 Hi-res aerial photography (UK Secret Bases, Jan 2007) reveals £30 million expansion project
 Telegraph March 2008

British intelligence agencies
Cryptography organizations
Information technology organisations based in the United Kingdom
Organisations based in Milton Keynes
Research institutes in Buckinghamshire